Replikator is a 1994 science fiction film directed by G. Philip Jackson and starring Michael St. Gerard, Brigitte Bako, Ned Beatty and Ilona Staller.

Cast
Michael St. Gerard as Ludo Ludovic
Brigitte Bako as Kathy Moscow
Ned Beatty as Inspector Victor Valiant
Ilona Staller as Miss Tina Show (as La Cicciolina)
Lisa Howard as Lena
Peter Outerbridge as John Cheever
Ron Lea as Byron Scott
David Hemblen as Police Chief
Mackenzie Gray as Candor
Frank Moore as Investigating Officer

Production
Producer Daniel D'or, an aerial photography specialist, filmed the movie's two helicopter chase scenes personally. Replikator was the first feature film for cinematographer Jonathan Freeman and the first feature for production designer Taavo Soodor.

Release
The film was mostly a direct to home-video release but had short theatrical runs in Japan, Canada, South Korea, South Africa, Malaysia and Indonesia. The film's success in many territories including the United States led to a business partnership between D'or and writer–director G. Philip Jackson.

Reception
In 1995, the film took the Gold Award at the WorldFest-Houston International Film Festival in the category of Sci-Fi/Horror and took the Silver award for Science Fiction at the Charleston International Film Festival.

External links

1994 films
1994 science fiction films
English-language Canadian films
Canadian science fiction films
1990s English-language films
1990s Canadian films